The 2009–10 Macedonian First League was the 18th season of the Macedonian First Football League, the highest football league of Macedonia. It began on 1 August 2009 and ended on 19 May 2010. Makedonija Gjorche Petrov were the defending champions having won their first Macedonian championship last season.

Promotion and relegation 

1 Makedonija Gjorche Petrov and Sloga Jugomagnat were expelled from the First League due to boycotting two matches in the season. However, Napredok was directly promoted.2 Pobeda was expelled from the First League due to the eight-year suspension from FIFA for their involvement in match-fixing scandal.

Participating teams

League table

Results
The schedule consists of three rounds. During the first two rounds, each team plays each other once home and away for a total of 22 matches. This season, due to the suspension of two teams, each team will play a total of 20 games. The pairings of the third round will then be set according to the standings after the first two rounds, giving every team a third game against each opponent for a total of 29 games per team.

Matches 1–22

1 Matches awarded because Makedonija, Turnovo, Sloga Jugomagnat and Pelister were boycotting the championship; Turnovo and Pelister later changed their positions.
2 Matches expunged after the suspension and expulsion of Makedonija, Sloga Jugomagnat and Pobeda.
3 The match was awarded to Metalurg after Vardar boycotted the match due to FFM's involvement in cancellation of Vardar's contract with Stefan Ristovski with illegal documents.

Matches 23–33

1 Matches expunged after the suspension and expulsion of Pobeda.

Relegation playoff

Top goalscorers

Source: Soccerway

See also
2009–10 Macedonian Football Cup
2009–10 Macedonian Second Football League

External links
Macedonia - List of final tables (RSSSF)
Football Federation of Macedonia 
MacedonianFootball.com

References

Macedonia
1
Macedonian First Football League seasons